Plaz is a surname. Notable people with this surname include:

Alejandro Plaz (born 1955), Venezuelan activist
Anton Wilhelm Plaz (1708–1784), German physician and botanist